Sandy Hook is an unincorporated community in Marion County, Mississippi, United States.
The unincorporated town of Little Improve is located within the township

Sandy Hook is the location of the historic John Ford Home.

References

Unincorporated communities in Marion County, Mississippi
Unincorporated communities in Mississippi